The Green Journal, in informal usage, may refer to:

 Obstetrics & Gynecology (journal)
 Radiotherapy & Oncology (journal)